Anatolian High School, or Anadolu High School, refers to public high schools in Turkey that admit their students according to high nationwide standardized test (LGS) scores, though this is not required for entering all Anatolian High Schools.

History

Anatolian high schools were established as an alternative to expensive private schools teaching in foreign languages and were modeled after the grammar schools. Some of the Anatolian high schools are newly established while other prestigious public schools were added to this category.

Originally six Maarif Koleji were established in six major cities of Turkey -- Istanbul, Izmir, Samsun, Konya, Eskişehir, and Diyarbakır -- in 1955, based on a special law enacted by the Turkish Parliament. (These were followed by more Anatolian Schools in later years.) The name was changed to "Anatolian High Schools" in 1975. These schools admitted students based on an academic test administered at the end of grade 5, which was the basic elementary education back then. The schools offered a year of foreign language education as a preparatory year followed by foreign-language medium of instruction seven years of middle and high school grades. Several private schools followed the Anatolian School model particularly as an alternative to foreign-based American, French and German schools. There is also one Anatolian School in Baku, Azerbaijan and one in Ashgabat, Turkmenistan.

Until 1997 Anatolian High Schools' teaching language was English, German, or French. Other high schools in Turkey were teaching in Turkish; foreign languages were taught only as elective courses.

Between 1976 and 1993, the number of Anatolian High Schools in Turkey increased to 193. Current High Schools were being transformed into Anatolian High Schools by changing their curriculum and education language. Government pursued this policy in order to improve the education quality in high schools, so they upgraded the convenient schools. But the rapid increase in the number of these schools brought a problem: There weren't enough teachers whom were qualified to teach in foreign language. Because of this shorthand, government made a reform in 1997 and set the education language to Turkish.

With education reform in 1997, mandatory education year increased to 8. This meant that every kid has to go to middle school. The government needed to separate middle schools and high schools for the new education system to be applied properly. Anatolian High School were no longer containing middle school students, and the entrance exam for these school moved to 8th grade. Throughout the years, the format of the entrance exam changed. The order of the placement exams is 1999-2004 LGS (Liselere Gecis Sinavi), 2004-2008 OKS (Ortaogratim Kurumlari Sinavi), 2008-2014 SBS (Seviye Belirleme Sinavi), 2014-2018 TEOG (Temel Egitimden Ortaogretime Gecis Sinavi), 2018–present LGS. Last exam (LGS) is different from the others because not all students are required to take it, so there are two ways to get into an Anatolian High School in the current system. First is based on student's address, and they go to the closest Anatolian High School. The other way is with the LGS exam. Students with good GPA enter this exam and they get the chance to apply to top quality Anatolian High Schools around Turkey.

The number of Anatolian High Schools increased up to 500 in 2003, 1700 in 2011, 3074 in 2017. With the new placement system in 2018, the number of Anatolian High Schools which required entrance exam was decreased to 222. Currently, all subjects (Physics, Chemistry, Mathematics, History etc...), except primary and secondary foreign language subjects, in Anatolian High Schools are being taught in Turkish. There are also some Anatolian High Schools which offer one year of foreign language education (Galatasaray Lisesi, Kabataş Erkek Lisesi, Istanbul Erkek Lisesi etc...).

See also
List of high schools in Turkey
Education in Turkey

References
 General Information About Turkish Educational System Including Anatolian High Schools